Küvənil (also, Güvənil, Kuvanil’, and Kuvenil’) is a village and municipality in the Lankaran Rayon of Azerbaijan.  It has a population of 1,205.

References 

Populated places in Lankaran District